Rajapara is a village in Kamrup rural district,

Transport
The village is near National Highway 37 and connected to nearby towns and cities with regular buses and other modes of transportation.

See also
 Sadilapur	
 Saledal
 Samuka

References

Villages in Kamrup district